Gleis 8 is a German pop group from Berlin and Hamburg that was formed in 2012. Their debut album Bleibt das immer so (2013) reached No. 7 in the German albums chart.

History 
Gleis 8 was formed by AnNa R., the singer from German pop duo Rosenstolz, and musicians Lorenz Allacher, Timo Dorsch and Manne Uhlig. The initial idea to work together came at AnNa R.'s birthday party in December 2011, and the four band members had their first music session in January 2012. They already knew each other for a long time prior to the formation of the band. Because AnNa R. and Allacher live in Berlin and Dorsch and Uhlig live in Hamburg, they named their band Gleis 8 (Platform 8), the platform at Berlin Hauptbahnhof (Berlin main station) from which trains to Hamburg depart.

AnNa R. has described the music of Gleis 8 as being pop music in the broadest sense. She has also stated that the band's music differs from that of Rosenstolz in that it is more upbeat and multifaceted and uses more guitars and real instruments. The band's debut album Bleibt das immer so, which was produced by Dorsch, was released in May 2013 and charted in Germany, Austria and Switzerland.

Gleis 8 gave their first live performances at the Astra Kulturhaus in Berlin-Friedrichshain in June 2013. The concerts took place on 25, 26, 28 and 29 June, with the first three concerts being sold out. Later that summer, they made an appearance in Wismar as one of the performing acts of the 2013 summer tour organized by German broadcaster NDR. At the end of 2013, Gleis 8 went on their first nationwide concert tour (the Bleibt das immer so tour), which took place over November and December and covered 12 cities in Germany.

Band members 
 AnNa R. – lead vocals
 Lorenz Allacher – multiple instruments
 Timo Dorsch – multiple instruments
 Manne Uhlig – drums

Discography

Studio albums

Singles

References

External links 
  
  at Universal Music Group website 

German pop music groups
Musical groups from Berlin
Musical groups from Hamburg